Vincennes Historic District is a national historic district located at Vincennes, Knox County, Indiana. The district encompasses 1,161 contributing buildings, 5 contributing sites, 9 contributing structures, and 37 contributing objects in the central business district and surrounding residential sections of Vincennes. It developed between about 1787 and 1955, and includes notable examples of Federal, Greek Revival, Italianate,  and Classical Revival style architecture. Located in the district are the separately listed George Rogers Clark National Historical Park, William Henry Harrison Home, Indiana Territorial Capitol, Old State Bank, and St. Francis Xavier Cathedral and Library. Other notable buildings include the Brouillet House (c. 1806), Knox County Courthouse (1873), Ellis Mansion (c. 1830), Lacy House (c. 1840), Dunn House (1840), Summers House (c. 1859–1866), Fyfield House (1860), Grannan House (c. 1870), Cauthorn House (c. 1874), Gimble-Bond Store (1879), and Rabb House (c. 1880–1890).

It was listed on the National Register of Historic Places in 1974.

References

Vincennes, Indiana
Historic districts on the National Register of Historic Places in Indiana
Federal architecture in Indiana
Italianate architecture in Indiana
Neoclassical architecture in Indiana
Greek Revival architecture in Indiana
Historic districts in Knox County, Indiana
National Register of Historic Places in Knox County, Indiana